Aleksandar Kostoski (born 5 March 1988) is a Macedonian professional basketball player. He currently plays for TFT. He is also a member of the Macedonian national team.

Pro career
Kostoski started his pro career with French team Pau Orthez in 2004.

National team
Kostoski has also been a member of the Macedonian national basketball team since 2004, when he represented Macedonia at the FIBA Europe Under-16 Championship. He has competed with the team at all FIBA levels of U16, U18, U20, even the Senior team. In the qualification games of the FIBA EuroBasket 2011 qualification, Kostoski was a member of the squad.
Aleksandar Kostoski is candidate for the Macedonian national basketball team for the 2012 FIBA World Olympic Qualifying Tournament in Caracas, Venezuela. According to the Coach Marjan Lazovski, Kostoski, along with Kiril Nikolovski and Bojan Trajkovski are likely to be the newest additions to the final team.
On 29 August 2018 he signed with Macedonian basketball club Gostivar.

References

External links

balkanleague.net
EuroLeague Profile

1988 births
Living people
BCM Gravelines players
CSU Pitești players
KK MZT Skopje players
KK Rabotnički players
KK Vardar players
Macedonian men's basketball players
Point guards
Sportspeople from Skopje